WYKE-CD (channel 47) is a low-power, Class A television station licensed to both Inglis and Yankeetown, Florida, United States, two cities in Levy County—part of the Gainesville market—but serving Citrus County, part of the Tampa Bay market. It is a translator of Clearwater-based WCLF (channel 22), the flagship station of the Christian Television Network (CTN).

History
The station was founded in 1982 as W49AI (channel 49). It was owned by the Citrus County Association for Retarded Citizens, a non-profit organization that assists handicapped and disabled people in Citrus County. The station repeated the TV signal of Orlando's WOFL, with some shows replaced with local programming. However, it did not carry WOFL's late-night programming, as it left the air around midnight. W49AI became a Fox affiliate when WOFL did in 1986.

W49AI dropped Fox and WOFL around 1991, when Ocala's WOGX affiliated with the Fox network. At that point, it offered more local programming, plus shows from other satellite networks, like America One (later Youtoo America, now YTA TV) and My Family TV. WYKE has also aired religious programming from Faith TV and Orlando independent station WACX.

In May 1995, W49AI became WYKE-LP, named after the Key Training Center in Inverness, where Citrus County's handicapped learn basic occupational skills for employment.

On February 9, 2005, WYKE relocated to channel 47 and became a Class A station (though they kept the "-LP" suffix). Soon after, on March 21, the station completed a flash-cut to digital, becoming one of the first licensed digital Class A stations in the United States. However, the station would not adopt a "-CD" suffix until 2009.

On December 10, 2021, it was announced that CTN would purchase WYKE-CD for $1 million; the sale was completed on March 15, 2022.

News operation
WYKE aired a half hour morning show called Citrus Today, hosted by Dennis Miller. Originally called Citrus Sunrise, the show aired weekdays at 9:30 a.m. and featured local news and public affairs segments.

In the past, the station has aired simulcasts of Gainesville ABC affiliate WCJB's morning, evening, and late newscasts.

References

External links

The Key Training Center

Low-power television stations in the United States
YKE-CD
Television channels and stations established in 1982
1982 establishments in Florida
Christian Television Network affiliates
Citrus County, Florida